Air Chief Commandant Dame Ruth Mary Eldridge Welsh,  (née Dalzell; 2 August 1896 – 25 June 1986), known as Mary Welsh, was second Director of the British Women's Auxiliary Air Force (WAAF), from 1943 to 1946.

Early life
Ruth Mary Eldridge Dalzell was born in Claughton, Birkenhead, the daughter of William Robert Dalzell and Ruth Mary Frances Annie Elizabeth Goldsworth Kirkpatrick Dalzell. Her father was a doctor.

Career
During the First World War, Mary Dalzell went to France as an ambulance driver in the First Aid Nursing Yeomanry, from October 1918 to June 1919.

As an Air Force wife, she traveled with her husband. In 1937, she joined the Emergency Service, and in 1938 the Auxiliary Territorial Service (ATS), the women's branch of the British Army. In 1939 she was promoted to senior commandant, based in London; she was transferred later that year to the Women's Auxiliary Air Force (WAAF). She served as inspector-general from 1942, and succeeded Katherine Jane Trefusis-Forbes to become second Director of the WAAF, from October 1943 to November 1946. In this work, she toured WAAF locations abroad, including Belgium, Italy, and India.

Honours and awards
 13 June 1946 – Air Chief Commandant Ruth Mary Eldridge, Lady Welsh, Women's Auxiliary Air Force, appointed a Dame Commander of the Order of the British Empire.
 17 July 1973 – Air Chief Comdt. Dame Ruth Mary Welsh, DBE (L/No 29023 ATS later 291 WAAF), retired awarded the Territorial Efficiency Decoration.

Personal life
Mary Dalzell married William Lawrie Welsh, an officer in the Royal Air Force, in 1922. They had a son, Michael, born in 1926. Her husband was knighted in 1941, making her Lady Welsh. The Welshes divorced in 1947, and she moved to Odiham, Hampshire. There she was active in historic preservation as president of the Odiham Society. Mary Welsh died, aged 89, on 25 June 1986, in Farnborough.

References

External links
Portrait in oils of Air Chief Commandant Mary Welsh

1896 births
1986 deaths
People from Birkenhead
Royal Air Force air marshals of World War II
Dames Commander of the Order of the British Empire
Women's Auxiliary Air Force officers
Female air force generals and air marshals
British women in World War I
British women in World War II
Military personnel from Merseyside
Wives of knights